China National Highway 204 (G204) runs from Yantai in Shandong Province to Shanghai. It is 1,031 kilometres in length and runs south from Yantai, going via Shandong and Jiangsu Province, and ends in Shanghai.

Route and distance

See also 

 China National Highways

Road transport in Shanghai
Transport in Jiangsu
Transport in Shandong
204